A Dozen and One Adventures is an accessory for the 2nd edition of the Advanced Dungeons & Dragons fantasy tabletop role-playing game, published in 1993.

Contents
A Dozen and One Adventures includes thirteen short adventures, featuring weird bathhouses, deceptive ghouls, amorous succubi, passionate genies, raucous merriment with desert riders, the sacred salt bond between host and guest, a boasting contest, a mummified talking head in the Hall of Lost Kings, Greek fire, a deranged fire mage, and the Brotherhood of True Flame. The adventures start with beginning characters, and the finale finishes with characters of levels 9-12.

Publication history
A Dozen and One Adventures was designed by Steven Kurtz.

Reception
Allen Varney reviewed A Dozen and One Adventures for Dragon magazine #219 (July 1995). He declares, "Now this is the stuff of Arabian adventure", and notes that "a lot of fire burns through the last half of these thirteen short adventures, despite one late episode in an inundated sand castle". Varney concludes with this assessment: "Starting with beginning characters, the Dozen and One Adventures develop a more-or-less continuous narrative up through the finale, for levels 9-12. Here the PCs become pawns, and occasionally onlookers, in a deadly struggle among the fire mage, the Soft Whisper assassins, a Leper King, and other high-power factions. Still, Kurtz (who has read all the Arabian Nights tales — "including the supplements!" he says, as if incredulous at his masochism) has summoned the flavor of the genre with impressive skill."

Reviews
White Wolf #44

References

Al-Qadim supplements
Role-playing game supplements introduced in 1994